Ayya is a 2005 Indian Tamil-language drama film written and directed by Hari, presented by K. Balachander and produced by Pushpa Kandasamy under banner Kavithalayaa Productions. The film stars Sarath Kumar in a dual role, along with Nayanthara and Napoleon, while Vadivelu, Prakash Raj, Lakshmi, Rohini, and Charle play the supporting roles. The music was composed by Bharadwaj. Ayya was also Nayanthara's debut in Tamil cinema.

Plot
The movie starts in the 1970s, where there is a heavy drought in the southern districts of Tamil Nadu. Ayyadurai and Madasamy are close friends and landlords of different castes in Tenkasi town in Tirunelveli district, and they try hard to help people and save them from dying during the drought. The local MLA, also a relative of Madasamy, smuggles rice given by the government, and people protest upon knowing about this. The MLA denies knowing anything about the sanctioned rice. That night, he starts to smuggle the rice, but the lorries are waylaid and ransacked by the people led by Madasamy. The MLA comes there and starts shooting towards people's legs. Ayyadurai sees the MLA aiming for Madasamy's head and pushes him. Then, Ayyadurai beats the MLA using the hilt of the gun, following which he dies. The local people support Ayyadurai and save him from police and also urge him to contest in the assembly by-elections.

Now the movie comes to the present, where Ayyadurai has been the unopposed MLA of Tenkasi for more than 35 years. He returns from Chennai after resigning his post because the state department did not sanction his request to renovate the lakes in his area. His son Chelladurai, a civil engineer, runs their business and helps his father for the people's welfare.  Selvi is Madasamy's teenage daughter who deliberately fails her 12th standard exam as she loves Chelladurai and wants to marry him. Meanwhile, Karuppusamy is the son of the MLA killed by Ayyadurai and wants to take revenge by either defeating or killing Ayyadurai. He has contested thrice against Ayyadurai in the past decade, with no avail. He has made around 20 attempts on Ayyadurai's life without any success. Meanwhile, Selvi proposes her love to Chelladurai, but he does not accept, saying that it might result in clashes between their families, as they both belong to different castes. Also, there comes a flashback where it is shown that a few years back, Chelladurai's arranged marriage got cancelled the night before the wedding as the bride Malavika had eloped with her lover, which makes Chelladurai feel embarrassed. Because of this, he prefers to stay unmarried.

Selvi, after failing her exams, informs about her love to both families, and after much deliberation due to varying caste, they decide to get them married. Now, Karuppusamy (being a second cousin of Madasamy) plays tricks to separate both Ayyadurai and Madasamy. He sends police on the day of marriage, saying that Selvi is still a minor and that it is illegal to get her married before 18 years of age. Ayyadurai accepts that and informs Madasamy to postpone the wedding. This angers Madasamy, and he believes that the police were sent only by Ayyadurai to cancel the marriage, as both of them belonged to different castes. The policeman also confirms Madasamy's suspicion, and the 4 generation friendship is broken off . Karuppusamy uses this opportunity to get close to Madasamy, and makes him the witness for the murder of his father a few years back by Ayyadurai. The police arrest Ayyadurai. The general election dates are announced in the state. The ruling party again gives a chance for Karuppusamy to contest, giving him an ultimatum to win. Ayyadurai cannot contest due to the murder case, and hence, he nominates an unwilling Chelladurai in his stead. Karuppusamy plans to murder Madasamy and blame Chelladurai for that so that Karuppusamy can get both caste votes and win the election. However, before that, Chelladurai saves Madasamy, though he later gives his signed withdrawal form to Karuppusamy and says that he let him become the unopposed MLA, as he is also a good-natured man, and his anger is only on Ayyadurai and not on the people of the town. Karuppusamy realizes his mistake and apologizes to Ayyadurai and Chelladurai for all his criminal activities. However, Ayyadurai prefers to stay in prison as he still feels guilty for murdering Karuppusamy's father years ago. Karuppusamy becomes the MLA, and Chelladurai and Selvi marry to unify the families.

Cast

Production
Hari decided to work with Bharadwaj in this movie after collaborating with Harris Jayaraj on his previous three films continuously.

Navya Nair was initially cast in the film, before being replaced by Nayanthara.

Soundtrack

The songs and background score were done by Bharadwaj in his second collaboration with director Hari after Thamizh. Lyrics written by Pa. Vijay, Na. Muthukumar, and Snehan. The song "Oru Vaarthai" was used in the 2006 Taiwanese film I Don't Want to Sleep Alone, as well as the official trailer for it.

Release and reception
The film's theatrical and satellite rights were sold to Ravichandran's Oscar Films for 7.25 crore at a table profit of 2.25 crore. Ayyaa was released on 14 January 2005 on Pongal festival alongside films like Thirupaachi, Aayudham and Devathaiyai Kanden.

The film received positive reviews from critics. Nowrunning.com gave 3/5, saying, "Another splendid performance from Sarath Kumar. His Pongal release "Ayya" has the right dose of emotions, drama and action. Hari, the director, played precisely by giving Sarath a memorable role". Malini Mannath of Chennai Online wrote "'Ayya' is an emotion-packed family drama worth watching." Behindwoods wrote "The director has presented the story with no villains, vulgarity, and crude commercial elements. Eventhough these types of films have come already, Hari’s screen play is what makes this film totally different from the others. Here only, the talent of a good director like Hari comes into light.". Visual Dasan of Kalki wrote even within the commercial formula, Ayya makes the mind heavy with high ambitions.

References

External links

2000s Tamil-language films
2005 action drama films
2005 films
Films directed by Hari (director)
Films shot in Tirunelveli
Films scored by Bharadwaj (composer)
Films set in the 1970s
Indian action drama films